Pike Lake State Park is a public recreation area located in the midst of the wooded hills of Pike County, five miles south of the village of Bainbridge, in the southern part of the U.S. state of Ohio. The state park contains a small lake with surrounding state forest, campground, and cabins. The site was developed by members of the Civilian Conservation Corps in the 1930s and became a state park in 1949.

References

External links
Pike Lake State Park Ohio Department of Natural Resources 
Pike Lake State Park Map Ohio Department of Natural Resources

State parks of Ohio
Lakes of Ohio
Protected areas of Pike County, Ohio
Protected areas established in 1949
1949 establishments in Ohio
Civilian Conservation Corps in Ohio
Nature centers in Ohio
Bodies of water of Pike County, Ohio